Interspel (from International English Spelling) is a set of principles introduced by Valerie Yule to meet the challenge of how to remove unpredictability and inconsistency from present English spelling, while keeping the present heritage of print through minimal change in its appearance.

The advantages of present spelling are maximized for users and learners by applying psychological research on their needs and abilities, facilitating both visual and auditory reading processes, and by taking account of the special features of the English language.  This also promotes visible relationships of English and international vocabulary.  

Principles for systematization reduce present disadvantages.  A phonemic spelling for beginners and dictionary pronunciation guides forms a base that then modifies.  Such a combination of advantages has been claimed to be impossible.  However, psychological and linguistic research and technological advances now make such a systematic reform more feasible, including breakthroughs by innovations that run counter to the usually expected proposals for spelling reform.

Levels
Interspel-style reform, still in process of development and testing, has the following four levels for learning and use:

  The alphabetic principle of sound-symbol correspondence, for beginner learners and for dictionary pronunciation keys.  The correspondence is diaphonic, that is, broad and conventionalized so that dialect variations are subsumed, as in the spellings dog and banana, and it represents clear formal speech, not casual slurring.
  Learners immediately move on to an unexpected feature of this reform, as they learn the irregular spellings of around thirty of the hundred most common words which make up about half of everyday text.  This dramatically retains half of the appearance of present print, and assists learners to start reading the print around them.
  Learners progressively move into reading and writing adult text with applied morphemic principles, such as consistent -s/es and -d/ed spellings for plural and tense endings.  Only a few differentiated spellings of homophones prove needful.  Doubled consonants can show irregular stress.  Transitional features include personal choice for the spelling of names and recognizing for reading but not needed for writing, eight one-way-pronunciation alternative spellings for vowels and alternative pronunciations of three consonants for reading.  This ‘Spelling without traps for reading’ then closely resembles existing English spelling, which it has made more consistent.
  Learners are directed to an internet forum and given instruction to spot spelling, grammar and punctuation and then correct them.

In this way, readers accustomed to present spelling are not inconvenienced.  Writers, including poor spellers, can use the predictable spellings that can be accepted as alternative spellings in dictionaries until usage determines public preference.  The first principle for present spellers can be to omit surplus letters in words that serve no purpose to represent meaning or pronunciation, and can often mislead.  This streamlining trend is already occurring, especially in text messaging.

The English spelling reform based on Interspel envisages an International English Spelling Commission to monitor research and authorize testing and implementation of findings.

Consistency principles
Summary of the principles for making English spelling more consistent, as applied in the experimental form Interspel:

1.  Retain the spelling of the most common hundred words, which make up about half of everyday text. 31 of these have irregular spelling: all, almost, always, among, are, come, some, could, should, would, half, know, of, off, one, only, once, other, pull, push, put, as, was, what, want, who, why, and international word endings -ion/-tion/-ssion plus -zion, as in question, passion, vizion.

2.  Regard spelling as a standardized conventionalized representation of the language (not merely its sounds), set out as in formal speech with minimal slurring.

3.  Apply the alphabetic principle of systematic sound-symbol correspondence, including regularizing current spelling patterns for final vowels, as in pity, may, be, hi-fi, go, emu, spa, her, hair, for, saw, cow, boy, too.

The primary vowels letters ‘a’, ‘e’, ‘i’, ‘o’, and ‘u’ are used to spell both 'long' and 'short' vowels, distinguishing long vowels as necessary by a diacritic (grave accent) as in national/nàtion, repetition/repèt, finish/fìnal, consolàtion/consòl, and consumtion/consùmer.  The remaining vowel sounds are spelled as in car, perturb (ur = stressed, er = unstressed), hair, fort, taut, round, boil, boot, and, still unsolved, spelling for the vowel sound with no spelling of its own, as in book (perhaps as buuk).

Sequences of vowels can then be represented very simply in Interspel.  Accents for learners are optional.  'Spelling for reading' vowel spellings are included below:

a – bazaar, pàella, dàis, (paid), càos, taut,
e – idèa, (year), (meet), bèing, crèol, hidèus
i – dìal, dìet, flìing, ìota, pìus
o – òasis, (boat), pòet, gòing, (boil), Zoo/zòolojy, out
u – dùal, sùet, flùid, dùo, inocùus.

Doubled consonants have only three purposes: to indicate irregular stress; rr for short vowels as in carrot and current, and possibly final /ss/ for nouns.

4.  This alphabetic base that relates letters to English speech sounds is modified with morphemic principles that represent grammar and meaning visually, as in plural and tense endings –s/es and –d/ed.

5.  Only a few sets of words that sound the same (homophones) are found to be so confusable that they need differentiated spellings.

6.  Names and places can be spelled as they please.

7.  Seven alternative vowel spellings with one-way pronunciation for reading: ai, ea, ee, igh, oa, ew, ir; and two possible pronunciations each for th, c, g and y, can also be recognized at the level of ‘Spelling for reading without traps’.  Nobody has to memorize these alternative spellings to use in their own writing.

The seven principles above are proposed for investigation.  They offer a feasible way to prevent English spelling remaining a serious barrier to literacy.  They change only around 2.6% of the letters in everyday text, so present readers would be hardly inconvenienced.  Its more consistent visible relationship of related words regularizes the 'Chomsky' features of English spelling, to promote faster automatic visual recognition in reading for meaning and a more predictable relationship to the spoken language for international users and learners.

Illustration
As an illustration, the following exemplar text from H.G. Wells' ‘The Star’, used by spelling reformers, is given in two levels of Interspel.

(a) Interspel ‘Spelling without traps for reading’:

(b) The  basic Interspel spelling for beginners with morphemic modifications, and 31 retained irregularly spelled words:

Here is another Interspel example.

- Frank Kermode

Comparison with other English spelling reform proposals
By way of comparison, other proposals for English spelling reform are of four types:

 New alphabets, such as the Shavian alphabet or the Deseret Alphabet;
 Including new symbols so that all English sounds have one 'letter' each, as in Pitman's Initial teaching alphabet or Unifon;
 Phonemic, with correspondence of graphemes and phonemes (letters and sounds) such as Rondthaler's American Spelling (SoundSpel),  the  Simplified Spelling Society's Nue Spelling, or the Basic Roman spelling of English. The 'long' vowels cause the greatest difficulty;
 Lists of re-spellings with or without rules, such as the Simplified Spelling Society's present House Style.

Interspel, however, is a systematic reform of present spelling with three levels, to match established needs and abilities of users and learners, in which the basic alphabetic principle is modified by morphemic principles, long and short vowels are visibly related, and the 31 most common irregular words are retained. It is more complex in design, but more practicable in use.

Until there is a breakthrough to an international script that can cross languages, like Chinese, Interspel proposes an improved spelling for English, the world's present lingua franca that could be essential for wider literacy and global communication.  The International English Spelling Commission envisaged by this language reform proposal would oversee and monitor informal and formal experimental research in English spelling improvement, and to implement the outcomes.

See also
 Spelling reform
 English spelling reform
 List of some English spelling reform proposals
 Valerie Yule

References

English spelling reform